The Farmer's Bank of Mackville, on Kentucky Route 152 in Mackville, Kentucky, was built in 1923.  It was later known as Springfield State Bank.  It was listed on the National Register of Historic Places in 1989.

It was deemed notable as a "Well-preserved example of major commercial structure in Mackville reflecting importance of local commercial institutions in rural Washington County at the turn of the [20th] century."

References

Bank buildings on the National Register of Historic Places in Kentucky
Italianate architecture in Kentucky
Commercial buildings completed in 1923
National Register of Historic Places in Washington County, Kentucky
1923 establishments in Kentucky